Cryptophis incredibilis, also known as the pink snake, is a species of venomous snake that is endemic to Australia. The specific epithet incredibilis (“incredible”) is presumed to refer to its unusual colouration.

Description
The upper body of the snake is a uniform pink, with a white belly. It is a slender snake which grows to an average of about 40 cm in length.

Behaviour
The snake is viviparous.

Distribution and habitat
The species’ distribution is limited to Prince of Wales Island, in Torres Strait, in the far north of Queensland, where it inhabits woodland on sandy soils.

References

 
incredibilis
Snakes of Australia
Reptiles of Queensland
Taxa named by Richard Walter Wells
Taxa named by Cliff Ross Wellington
Reptiles described in 1985